Goma Devi Timilsina a Nepalese politician and member of CPN (Unified Socialist). She is also member of Rastriya Sabha and was elected from 2022 Nepalese National Assembly election.

References

External links
सदस्यहरु

Living people
Nepalese politicians
Members of the National Assembly (Nepal)
Year of birth missing (living people)